RCA Victrola was a budget record label introduced by RCA Victor in the early 1960s to reissue classical recordings originally released on the RCA Victor "Red Seal" label.  The name "Victrola" came from the early console phonographs first marketed by the Victor Talking Machine Company in 1906. Many of RCA Victrola's reissues included recordings from the historic RCA Victor "Living Stereo" series first released in 1958, using triple channel stereophonic tapes from as early as 1954.

See also
 RCA Red Seal Records
 RCA Camden
 List of record labels

References

American record labels
Classical music record labels
Reissue record labels
RCA Records
Record labels established in 1962
Record labels disestablished in 2004